The GR 42 is a long-distance walking route of the Grande Randonnée network in France. The route connects Beaucaire with Saint-Étienne.

Along the way, the route passes through:
 Beaucaire
 Pujaut
 Orsan
 Meysse
 Plats
 Bourg-Argental
 Saint-Étienne

References

Hiking trails in France